Andrew C. Boynton (born c. 1957) is an American academic administrator. He is the John and Linda Powers Family Dean of the Carroll School of Management at Boston College, and the co-author of three books.

Early life
Andrew C. Boynton was born circa 1957. He graduated from Boston College, and earned a master in business administration and a PhD from the Kenan–Flagler Business School at the University of North Carolina at Chapel Hill.

Career
Boynton began his career as an assistant professor at the University of Virginia Darden School of Business, where he taught from 1987 to 1992. He taught at the International Institute for Management Development (IMD) from 1992 to 1994, and he was a tenured associate professor at the UNC Kenan–Flagler Business School from 1994 to 1996. He was a professor of Strategy at IMD from 1996 to 2004.

Boynton is the John and Linda Powers Family Dean at Boston College's Carroll School of Management. He is the co-author of three books.

Works

References

Living people
1950s births
Boston College alumni
UNC Kenan–Flagler Business School alumni
University of Virginia faculty
University of North Carolina at Chapel Hill faculty
Boston College faculty
Business school deans
American university and college faculty deans